Richard Frederick Toutcher (27 May 1861 – 6 September 1941) was an Australian politician.

He was born in Maryborough to Charles and Ellen Toutcher and attended the local grammar school. He became a civil servant in the Postal Department, and was active in the campaign for Federation. Considered a Deakinite Liberal, he was elected to the Victorian Legislative Assembly for Ararat in 1897, transferring to Stawell and Ararat in 1904. He was Minister of Public Instruction and Forests from April to July 1924. He continued in the Assembly until 1935, serving as a member of the Nationalist and United Australia parties. Toutcher died in Elsternwick in 1941.

References

1861 births
1941 deaths
Nationalist Party of Australia members of the Parliament of Victoria
United Australia Party members of the Parliament of Victoria
Members of the Victorian Legislative Assembly